Tony Garcia may refer to:

 Tony Garcia (video game producer), video game producer and designer
 Humberto Tony García, voice actor and announcer
 Tony Garcia (playwright), American playwright
 Tony Garcia (racing driver), Cuban American racing driver
 Tony Garcia (singer), American singer and music producer

See also 
 Antonio García (disambiguation)